Louis Dodero was a French photographer from Marseilles.  He is credited with inventing the Carte de visite in 1851.  However, another photographer, André-Adolphe-Eugène Disdéri patented this type of photograph on November 27, 1854.

References

French photographers